Okeanomyces is a genus of fungi in the family Halosphaeriaceae. This is a monotypic genus, containing the single species Okeanomyces cucullatus, described as new to science in 2004.

References

Microascales
Monotypic Sordariomycetes genera